Sandra Scoppettone (born June 1, 1936, Morristown, New Jersey) is an American author whose career spans the 1960s through the 2000s. She is known for her mystery and young adult books.

She wrote Suzuki Beane (1961 with illustrator Louise Fitzhugh.)

She came out as a lesbian in the 1970s. Her play Home Again, Home Again, Jiggerty Jig was produced by TOSOS, a gay and lesbian theatre company, in 1975. Her book Happy Endings Are All Alike (1978) was one of the earliest young-adult books to depict a lesbian relationship; it was chosen by the American Library Association for its "Best Books for Young Adults" list. Three of her novels have been finalists for the Lambda Literary Award for Lesbian Mystery.

Publications

Mystery 
Some Unknown Person (1977)
Such Nice People (1980)
Innocent Bystanders (1983)
Beautiful Rage (2004)
This Dame for Hire (2005)
Too Darn Hot (2006)

As Jack Early 
A Creative Kind of Killer (1984)
Razzamatazz (1985)
Donato & Daughter (1988)

Lauren Laurano series 
Everything You Have Is Mine (1991)
I'll Be Leaving You Always (1993)
My Sweet Untraceable You (1994)
Let's Face The Music and Die (1996)
Gonna Take a Homicidal Journey (1999)

Young adult literature 
Trying Hard to Hear You (1974)
The Late Great Me (1976)
Happy Endings Are All Alike (1978)
Long Time Between Kisses (1982)
Playing Murder (1985)

Children's books 
 Bang, Bang, You're Dead (co-written with Louise Fitzhugh, illus. Fitzhugh) (Harper & Row, 1969)

References

External links 
  
 
 Jack Early at LC Authorities, with 3 records

1936 births
20th-century American novelists
21st-century American novelists
American mystery writers
American women novelists
American writers of Italian descent
American lesbian writers
LGBT people from New Jersey
Living people
American LGBT novelists
Women mystery writers
20th-century American women writers
21st-century American women writers
People from Morristown, New Jersey
Novelists from New Jersey